Apodops is an extinct genus of early caecilians from the Early Eocene Itaboraí Formation of Brazil. The type species of the genus is A. pricei, described based on an isolated and broken trunk vertebra.

References

Further reading 
 Barcelos, L.A., Santos, R.O. The Lissamphibian Fossil Record of South America. Palaeobio Palaeoenv (2022). 
 R. Estes and M. H. Wake. 1972. The first fossil record of caecilian amphibians. Nature 239:228-231
 Biology of Amphibians by William E. Duellman and Linda Trueb 
 The Big Book Of Dinosaurs by David Norman 
 Amphibians: The World of Frogs, Toads, Salamanders and Newts by Robert Hofrichter
 Colbert's Evolution of the Vertebrates: A History of the Backboned Animals Through Time by Edwin H. Colbert, Michael Morales, and Eli C. Minkoff

Caeciliidae
Eocene amphibians
Paleogene amphibians of South America
Eocene animals of South America
Itaboraian
Eocene Brazil
Fossils of Brazil
Fossil taxa described in 1972